The Last Reef and Other Stories (published by Elastic Press) is a collection of science fiction short stories by British writer Gareth L. Powell. It compiles much of his short fiction from before 2008.

Stories
"Sunsets and Hamburgers": A 2006 short story originally in Byzarium. This was an experimental story based around the concept of Transrealism.
"The Last Reef": A 2006 story and Powell's first Interzone sale. The story features the technical concept of a machine that can be used to transform its user. Reprinted on Best SF.
"The Redoubt": A 2007 story, archived in Aphelion. The story is a first person narrative telling of the memories of one of the last humans alive.
"Ack-Ack Macaque": Powell's second Interzone sale and winner of the 2007 Interzone reader's poll for best short story. It will be incorporated into a novel of the same name, Powell's third. An audio version is found on Transmissions From Beyond.
"Pod Dreams of Tuckertown": A 2007 story, archived in Byzarium.
"Six Lights off Green Star": A 2005 story featuring starship pilots engaging in the sport of "random-jumping" via hyperdrives into unknown areas of space. Archived on Infinity Plus. Elements of this story were later incorporated into The Recollection.
"Distant Galaxies Colliding": a 2005 short story, originally in Quantum Muse. Also archived on Infinity Plus. Elements of this story were later incorporated into The Recollection.
"Falling Apart": A dark, entropic, near future story from 2008 set in a decaying Weston-super-Mare.
"Morning Star": a revised edition of the cyberpunk-inspired "Catch A Burning Star" from 2004. The original was published on Aphelion.
"A Necklace of Ivy": A rewritten version of a 1995 short story.
"Hot Rain": A 2008 story expanding on an incident mentioned in "The Last Reef".
"The Long Walk Aft": Flash Fiction from 2008. Collected on Powell's website.
"Arches": A 2008 story inspired by the London skyline. Elements of this story were later incorporated into The Recollection.
"Flotsam": A 2008 story set in the same milieu as "The Last Reef" and "Hot Rain".
"Cat in a Box": A retitled version of Powell's 2005 story "The Kitten Box". Part of Aphelion's "Mare Inebrium" setting.

External links
The Last Reef and Other Stories on Gareth L. Powell's website

2008 short story collections
Science fiction short story collections
British short story collections